Richard Gunn (born May 23, 1975) is an American actor. He is best known for portraying Calvin "Sketchy" Theodore in the Fox series Dark Angel (2000–2002), Chief of Police John Sanders in the BYU TV series Granite Flats, and Aitor Quantic in the third and final season of the Netflix original series Hemlock Grove.

Early life
Richard Gunn (sometimes credited as Richard Neal) was born in Thousand Oaks, California, and is the stepson of composer Earle Hagen who composed The Andy Griffith Show theme along with the themes for I Spy and Mod Squad, among others. He was raised in Thousand Oaks and Palm Desert, California with his two sisters. He attended UC Santa Cruz and graduated with honors.

Career
Gunn spent his first summer out of University performing in Shakespeare's Richard III and As You Like It with the professional repertory theater company Shakespeare Santa Cruz. His first television success came as the series regular role of Calvin "Sketchy" Theodore in the television series Dark Angel, which ran for two seasons on Fox. Dark Angel also won a People's Choice Award for Favorite Television New Dramatic Series. In 2013, Gunn was cast as Chief of Police John Sanders, in the BYUtv series Granite Flats. The show ran three seasons until 2015 and co starred Parker Posey and Christopher Lloyd and became available on Netflix in May 2015. Gunn was then cast as Aitor Quantic in the third and final season of the Netflix original Hemlock Grove, which premièred October 23, 2015. Gunn has appeared in numerous films and television episodes, and starred opposite James Caan and Paul Sorvino in the critically acclaimed Lionsgate release For the Love of Money. Gunn is also featured along with Charlize Theron in the thriller, Dark Places, which is based on the novel by Gillian Flynn.

Personal life
From 2008–2011, Gunn took a break from the entertainment industry to live on a ranch near Sequoia Park with his then fiancé, writer and producer Jenna Mattison. Mattison and Gunn married on February 14, 2013 and currently live in Los Angeles, California.

Filmography

Film

Television

References

External links
 

American male television actors
People from Thousand Oaks, California
Living people
1975 births